The events of 1996 in anime.

Accolades
Animation Film Award: Black Jack
Ōfuji Noburō Award: Rusuban

Releases

Deaths
Hiroshi Fujimoto, manga artist, co-creator of Doraemon

See also
1996 in animation

References

External links 
Japanese animated works of the year, listed in the IMDb

Anime
Anime
Years in anime